Neobrettus is a genus of Asian jumping spiders that was first described by F. R. Wanless in 1984. The name is a combination of the prefix "neo-" and the salticid genus Brettus.

Species
 it contains six species, found only in Asia:
Neobrettus cornutus Deeleman-Reinhold & Floren, 2003 – Borneo
Neobrettus heongi Barrion & Barrion-Dupo, 2013 – China
Neobrettus nangalisagus Barrion, 2001 – Philippines
Neobrettus phui Zabka, 1985 – Vietnam
Neobrettus tibialis (Prószyński, 1978) (type) – Bhutan to Malaysia, Borneo
Neobrettus xanthophyllum Deeleman-Reinhold & Floren, 2003 – Borneo

References

External links
 Photograph of Neobrettus sp.

Salticidae genera
Salticidae
Spiders of Asia